The Silvretta Reservoir is a reservoir in Austria. It, along with the Vermunt Reservoir, feeds the Obervermuntwerk II pumped-storage power plant.

References

External links
 

Reservoirs in Austria
Lakes of Vorarlberg